Ashish J. Thakkar is a Rwandan-based entrepreneur. He is the founder of Mara Group and Mara Foundation, and he is a co-founder of Atlas Mara Limited. Thakkar was born in the United Kingdom, but he moved to East Africa as a teenager before founding Mara Group, a Pan-African conglomerate, at the age of 15. Mara Group's operations and investments span 22 African countries. He is the author of The Lion Awakes: Adventures in Africa's Economic Miracle.

Thakkar is a member of the World Economic Forum's Young Global Leaders, and was included in Fortune magazine's list of the top "40 Under 40" in 2013. He was awarded the Base Leadership Award at the 2014 MTV Africa Music Awards event. Esquire named him Middle East Man of the Year in 2016.

In 2015, Thakkar was appointed Chair of the United Nations Foundation's Global Entrepreneurs Council and in 2017, he was appointed Chair of the Presidential Youth Advisory Group at the African Development Bank

Early life and education
Thakkar's family emigrated from the Indian state of Gujarat to Africa in the 1890s. Thakkar was born in Leicester in 1981. He spent his childhood at Rushey Mead School as part of Belvoir S form group. His parents had moved to the United Kingdom in 1972 when Idi Amin enforced the expulsion of Asians from Uganda. Thakkar and his family returned to Africa to live in Rwanda before they were again forced to leave due to the Rwandan genocide in 1994. The Thakkar family then fled to Burundi before settling in Uganda as refugees. At 15 years old, Thakkar dropped out of school to start his own business with a $5,000 loan.

Career
Thakkar founded his own company, Mara Group, in 1996 at the age of 15. He began by importing computer parts including keyboards, mouses, and desktops from weekly trips to Dubai. After Thakkar had received a $5,000 loan to start his company, he opened the small IT business in a shopping mall across the street from his father's shop in Kampala.

Over the next ten years, Thakkar expanded Mara Group into manufacturing, real estate, agriculture and IT services. Thakkar later relocated the company headquarters to Dubai, but kept business in Africa.

In 2013, Thakkar announced a partnership with Bob Diamond to launch Atlas Mara, a company that invests in commercial banking institutions across Africa. Diamond, the former chief executive of Barclays, and Thakkar met at a conference through their foundations, Mara Foundation and the Diamond Family Foundation. Thakkar and Diamond raised $325 million in funding in December 2013, before listing the company on the London Stock Exchange. The stock price has continued steadily declining and has lost 95% of its IPO price. The ticker symbol in London is ATMA.LN, while in the United States, the ticker is AAMAF.

Other activities
Thakkar founded Mara Foundation, a non-profit company that mentors and supports young African entrepreneurs, in 2009. Mara Mentor, a mobile application that connects young entrepreneurs with business professionals, was launched through Mara Foundation.

In June 2014, Thakkar participated in the "Global Accelerator" event hosted by the United Nations Foundation and the United Nations Office for Partnerships to discuss entrepreneurships in UN objectives. Thakkar presented and worked at the event of over 100 entrepreneurs and UN officials including Michael Dell, Barbara Bush and Arianna Huffington. In August 2014, Thakkar participated in the US-Africa summit, hosted by the White House, alongside former U.S. President Bill Clinton. He has also participated in the UN Women Initiative, and was a guest speaker at the Emirates Foundation Youth Philanthropy Summit in November 2014.

See also
Atlas Mara Co-Nvest Limited

References

External links

Harvard Business School Mara Group Case Study

1981 births
Living people
British chief executives
Emirati company founders
Emirati chief executives
British company founders
British people of Indian descent
Gujarati people
British philanthropists
British male writers
Rwandan businesspeople